The Madonna on a Crescent Moon in HortusConclusus is a 1450s painting by an unknown artist referred to as the “”. It is held by the Gemäldegalerie in Berlin.

Hortus Conclusus is Latin for “enclosed garden”, a motif of biblical origin where the VirginMary herself is represented as a garden.

References

Birds in art
Paintings of the Madonna and Child